The second season of the crime drama television series Wentworth premiered on SoHo in Australia on May 20, 2014. It was executively produced by Fremantle Media's director of drama Jo Porter. The season consisted of 12 episodes.

The second season picks up three months after Bea Smith murdered Jacs Holt while Bea was suffering in the slot and Franky Doyle rose to the position of top dog unopposed. However, the introduction of a new governor, Joan Ferguson is about to shake everything up.

Cast

Regular 
 Danielle Cormack as Bea Smith
 Nicole da Silva as Franky Doyle
 Kate Atkinson as Deputy Governor Vera Bennett
 Celia Ireland as Liz Birdsworth
 Shareena Clanton as Doreen Anderson
 Aaron Jeffery as Matthew "Fletch" Fletcher 
 Robbie Magasiva as Will Jackson
 Katrina Milosevic as Sue "Boomer" Jenkins
 Pamela Rabe as Governor Joan Ferguson

Recurring 
 Socratis Otto as Maxine Conway
 Georgia Chara as Jess Warner
 Ally Fowler as Simone "Simmo" Slater
 Kathryn Beck as Sky Pierson
 Jacquie Brennan as Linda Miles
 Reef Ireland as Brayden Holt
 Ra Chapman as Kim Chang
 Luke McKenzie as Nash Taylor
 Maggie Naouri as Rose Atkins
 Steve Le Marquand as Colin Bates
 Tony Briggs as Steve Faulkner
 Kasia Kaczmarek as Lindsay Coulter
 Katherine Halliday as Sarah Briggs
 Alex Menglet as Fencing Master
 Marta Kaczmarek as Marge Plymouth

Episodes

Production 
Wentworth was commissioned for a second season on 5 June 2013. The executive director of Foxtel Television, Brian Walsh stated of the renewal, "Wentworth's bold storytelling has attracted a record-breaking response from our Foxtel customers. This drama, tailor-made for Australian subscription television, is capturing local and international attention sparked by its Prisoner heritage." The director of production company, Fremantle Media Australia and executive producer of Wentworth, Jo Porter stated "We have assembled an extraordinary team of writers who can't wait to get started on season two. We have so many more stories to tell."

Filming 
Filming for the 12-part second season began in a purposely built set in Clayton, Victoria, Melbourne on 23 September 2013 and wrapped on 13 February 2014.

Crew 
Amanda Crittenden stayed on as Wentworth producer. Kevin Carlin and Catherine Millar will return as directors and will be joined by Pino Amenta, Steve Jodrell and Dee McLachlan. Marcia Gardner will become script producer and be a part of the writing team alongside Tim Hobart, Pete McTighe, and John Ridley.

Casting 
It was revealed that iconic Prisoner character Joan "The Freak" Ferguson, a sinister lesbian prison officer, would be introduced in the second season. Porter commented "Prisoner offered up a very rich well of amazing characters to draw upon and the Wentworth writers are very excited about revisiting the character of prison officer Joan 'The Freak' Ferguson in our second season." On 21 September 2013, it was confirmed that Pamela Rabe had been cast as Joan Ferguson.

Kris McQuade (Jacs Holt), Catherine McClements (Meg Jackson) and Leeanna Walsman (Erica Davidson) did not reprise their respective roles for the second season. Katrina Milosevic, who portrays Sue "Boomer" Jenkins was upgraded to the main cast, as was Rabe.

Reception

Ratings

Accolades 

 AACTA Awards (2015)
 Nominated: AACTA Award for Best Lead Actress in a Television Drama — Danielle Cormack (Episode 11: "Into the Night")
 ASTRA Awards (2015)
 Won: Most Outstanding Performance by a Female Actor — Danielle Cormack
 Nominated: Most Outstanding Performance by a Female Actor — Celia Ireland
 Nominated: Most Outstanding Performance by a Female Actor — Nicole da Silva
 Nominated: Most Outstanding Performance by a Female Actor — Pamela Rabe
 Nominated: Most Outstanding Performance by a Male Actor — Aaron Jeffery
 Nominated: Most Outstanding Performance by a Male Actor — Robbie Magasiva
 Won: Most Outstanding Drama — Wentworth
 Australian Directors Guild (2015)
 Nominated: Best Direction in a TV Drama Series — Kevin Carlin (Episode 11: "Into the Night")
 Australian Writers' Guild Awards (2015)
 Nominated: Best Script for a Television Series — Pete McTighe (Episode 12: "Fear Her")
 Logie Awards (2015)
 Won: Most Outstanding Drama Series — Wentworth 
 Won: Most Outstanding Actress — Danielle Cormack
 Nominated: Most Outstanding Actress — Nicole da Silva

Home media

References

2014 Australian television seasons
Wentworth (TV series)